Birha may refer to:

 Birha (folk song), an folk song genre of India
 Birha River, a river in South Africa